Saint Martial is a 3rd century Catholic and Orthodox saint and the first bishop of Limoges.

Saint Martial or Saint-Martial may also refer to:

Communes in France
 Saint-Martial, Ardèche, in the Ardèche département 
 Saint-Martial, Cantal, in the Cantal département
 Saint-Martial, Charente, in the Charente département
 Saint-Martial, Charente-Maritime, in the Charente-Maritime département
 Saint-Martial, Gard, in the Gard département
 Saint-Martial, Gironde, in the Gironde département

People
 Saint Martial, the son of Felicitas, venerated in Italy
 Martial of Rome, secretary of the apostle Peter, mentioned at Santa Maria in Via Lata

Other uses
 Abbey of Saint Martial, Limoges
 Petit Séminaire Collège Saint-Martial, a high school in Port-au-Prince, Haiti
 St. Martial school, a style of Aquitanian polyphony in medieval music

See also
 Other communes in France:
 Saint-Martial-de-Mirambeau, in the Charente-Maritime département
 Saint-Martial-de-Vitaterne, in the Charente-Maritime département
 Saint-Martial-sur-Né, in the Charente-Maritime département
 Saint-Martial-de-Gimel, in the Corrèze département
 Saint-Martial-Entraygues, in the Corrèze département
 Saint-Martial-le-Mont, in the Creuse département
 Saint-Martial-le-Vieux, in the Creuse département
 Saint-Martial-d'Albarède, in the Dordogne département
 Saint-Martial-d'Artenset, in the Dordogne département
 Saint-Martial-de-Nabirat, in the Dordogne département
 Saint-Martial-de-Valette, in the Dordogne département
 Saint-Martial-Viveyrol, in the Dordogne département
 Saint-Martial-sur-Isop, in the Haute-Vienne département